Scott Roger Jorgensen (born September 17, 1982) is a retired American mixed martial artist who competed in the Bantamweight division.  A professional competitor since 2006, Jorgensen has formerly competed for the UFC, WEC, and ShoXC.

Background
Born in Utah and raised in Alaska and Idaho, Jorgensen began wrestling at the age of five, going on to become a two-time state champion as well as a two-time state runner-up at Eagle High School. Jorgensen continued wrestling on a scholarship to Boise State University where he was a three-time Pac-10 Champion. Jorgensen has been diagnosed with vitiligo. According to Jorgensen from an interview with MMARecap.com, "Its just a pigmentation disorder that basically my immune system fights off pigment cells and loses its color." In another interview, he talks about when he first noticed it happening. "It started in ninth grade. I noticed a small spot on my wrist and I didn't think much of it. My mom offered to take me to a doctor but I didn't want to go. It kind of bothered me because I didn't know how to explain it to people ... and some people were ignorant. So I just involved myself with what I do best, which is wrestling, and I've always had lots of friends. It got to the point where I decided you'll either accept me or you won't and if it's because of my skin then you've got bigger issues than I do. I just don't care, it doesn't bother me. It's something that makes me who I am. It is me and it's never hindered me in any way. It's funny to see people talk about it."

Mixed martial arts career

Early career
Jorgensen began his mixed martial arts career fighting in several respected regional promotions, including, X-Fighting Championships, Alaska Fighting Championships, Ring of Fire, and ShoXC.

World Extreme Cagefighting
Jorgensen made his WEC debut against Damacio Page at WEC 32, falling via unanimous decision, in a fight that has been reported as having Jorgensen suffering health problems from his vitiligo at the time of the fight. Jorgensen then went on to earn victories in his next two bouts against established veterans Kenji Osawa at WEC 35 and Frank Gomez at WEC 38.

Jorgensen dropped an extremely close split decision to Antonio Banuelos at WEC 41 in a bout that was described by Reed Harris as one of the best fights in all of 2009.

Jorgensen was scheduled to fight Rafael Rebello on September 2, 2009 at WEC 43. However, Rebello was forced to withdraw due to injury and was replaced by Noah Thomas. Jorgensen defeated Thomas via TKO in the first round.

Jorgensen defeated Takeya Mizugaki on December 19, 2009 at WEC 45, via unanimous decision (29-28, 29-28, 29-28).  The bout also earned Fight of the Night honors.

Jorgensen's his next opponent was Chad George on March 6, 2010 at WEC 47. He won via submission due to a standing guillotine choke 31 seconds into the first round.

Jorgensen faced Antonio Banuelos in a long-awaited rematch on April 24, 2010 at WEC 48, replacing an injured Damacio Page. Jorgensen won the rematch by unanimous decision.

Jorgensen defeated Brad Pickett via unanimous decision on August 18, 2010 at WEC 50.

Jorgensen finally got his title shot and faced Dominick Cruz on December 16, 2010 at the promotion's final event, WEC 53.  The winner of the bout would become both the final WEC Bantamweight Champion and the first ever UFC Bantamweight Champion, marking the first time a UFC title would be awarded outside the UFC. Jorgensen lost the fight via unanimous decision.

Ultimate Fighting Championship
In October 2010, World Extreme Cagefighting merged with the Ultimate Fighting Championship. As part of the merger, all WEC fighters were transferred to the UFC.

Jorgensen faced Ken Stone on June 4, 2011 at The Ultimate Fighter 13 Finale. Jorgensen won the fight via KO after knocking Stone out cold with punches from inside Stone's closed guard during the first round.

Jorgensen next faced Jeff Curran on October 29, 2011 at UFC 137. He won the fight via unanimous decision.

Jorgensen then fought Renan Barão on February 4, 2012 at UFC 143. He lost the fight via unanimous decision.

Jorgensen next faced Eddie Wineland on June 8, 2012 at UFC on FX 3.  Wineland defeated Jorgenson via second-round knockout, notable for the fact it marked the first time that the durable Jorgensen had been stopped via strikes.  Their back and forth action earned both participants Fight of the Night honors.

Jorgensen then faced John Albert on December 8, 2012 at UFC on Fox 5. Jorgensen won the fight via submission in the first round earning Submission of the Night and Fight of the Night  honors for his performance.

Jorgensen faced Urijah Faber on April 13, 2013 in the main event at The Ultimate Fighter 17 Finale. After a fast-paced and technical fight, Faber submitted Jorgensen via rear naked choke at 3:16 in the 4th round.

Move to Flyweight
It was announced on September 17 that Jorgensen would be moving down to Flyweight. He was expected to face Ian McCall on December 14, 2013 at UFC on Fox 9.  However, McCall was forced out of the bout with an injury and replaced by John Dodson.  Then on December 3, Dodson himself was forced from the bout after sustaining a knee injury.  Jorgensen instead faced promotional newcomer Zach Makovsky.  He lost the fight via unanimous decision.

Jorgensen faced Jussier Formiga on March 23, 2014 at UFC Fight Night 38. Jorgensen lost the fight via submission in the first round.  Formiga unintentionally butted Jorgensen's chin with the top of his skull, which went unnoticed by the referee and submitted the dazed Jorgensen via rear naked choke. Jorgensen appealed the headbutt to the Brazilian Athletic Commission, however the result was upheld.

Jorgensen faced Danny Martinez on June 7, 2014 at UFC Fight Night 42. He won the fight via unanimous decision.  The win also earned Jorgensen his third Fight of the Night bonus award.

Jorgensen was expected to face promotional newcomer Henry Cejudo on August 30, 2014 at UFC 177. However, due to medical issues related to cutting weight, Cejudo was forced out the bout prior to the weigh-ins and Jorgensen was subsequently pulled from the event.

Jorgensen faced Wilson Reis on October 25, 2014 at UFC 179. Prior to the bout, Jorgensen missed weight and was fined 20% of his purse. He lost the fight via submission in the first round.

Jorgensen faced Manvel Gamburyan in a bantamweight bout on July 15, 2015 at UFC Fight Night 71. He lost the fight via unanimous decision.

Jorgensen faced Alejandro Pérez on November 21, 2015 at The Ultimate Fighter Latin America 2 Finale.  He lost the fight via TKO due to an ankle injury in the second round.

On February 9, 2016, Jorgensen was released from the UFC.

Personal life
Jorgensen has a son and a bachelor's degree in physiology. He also directs marketing for a home health company. Jorgensen is half-Caucasian and half-Japanese. Jorgensen is also a part owner of SBG Idaho in Boise, Idaho.

Championships and accomplishments
Ultimate Fighting Championship
Fight of the Night (Three times) vs. Eddie Wineland, John Albert, Danny Martinez 
Submission of the Night (One time) vs. John Albert 
World Extreme Cagefighting
Fight of the Night (Two times) vs. Takeya Mizugaki, Brad Pickett

Mixed martial arts record

|-
|Loss
|align=center|15–12
|Alejandro Pérez
|TKO (ankle injury)
|The Ultimate Fighter Latin America 2 Finale: Magny vs. Gastelum
|
|align=center|2
|align=center|4:26
|Monterrey, Mexico
| 
|-
| Loss
| align=center| 15–11
| Manvel Gamburyan
| Decision (unanimous)
| UFC Fight Night: Mir vs. Duffee
| 
| align=center| 3
| align=center| 5:00
| San Diego, California, United States
|
|-
| Loss
| align=center| 15–10
| Wilson Reis
| Submission (arm-triangle choke)
| UFC 179
| 
| align=center| 1
| align=center| 3:28
| Rio de Janeiro, Brazil
| 
|-
| Win
| align=center| 15–9
| Danny Martinez
| Decision (unanimous)
| UFC Fight Night: Henderson vs. Khabilov
|  
| align=center| 3
| align=center| 5:00
| Albuquerque, New Mexico, United States
| 
|-
| Loss
| align=center| 14–9
| Jussier Formiga
| Submission (rear-naked choke)
| UFC Fight Night: Shogun vs. Henderson 2
|  
| align=center| 1
| align=center| 3:07
| Natal, Brazil
| 
|-
| Loss
| align=center| 14–8
| Zach Makovsky
| Decision (unanimous)
| UFC on Fox: Johnson vs. Benavidez 2
| 
| align=center| 3
| align=center| 5:00
| Sacramento, California, United States
| 
|-
| Loss
| align=center| 14–7
| Urijah Faber
| Submission (rear-naked choke)
| The Ultimate Fighter: Team Jones vs. Team Sonnen Finale
| 
| align=center| 4
| align=center| 3:16
| Las Vegas, Nevada, United States
| 
|-
| Win
| align=center| 14–6
| John Albert
| Submission (rear-naked choke)
| UFC on Fox: Henderson vs. Diaz
| 
| align=center| 1
| align=center| 4:59
| Seattle, Washington, United States
| 
|-
| Loss
| align=center| 13–6
| Eddie Wineland
| KO (punches)
| UFC on FX: Johnson vs. McCall
| 
| align=center| 2
| align=center| 4:10
| Sunrise, Florida, United States
| 
|-
| Loss
| align=center| 13–5
| Renan Barão
| Decision (unanimous)
| UFC 143
| 
| align=center| 3
| align=center| 5:00
| Las Vegas, Nevada, United States
| 
|-
| Win
| align=center| 13–4
| Jeff Curran
| Decision (unanimous)
| UFC 137
| 
| align=center| 3
| align=center| 5:00
| Las Vegas, Nevada, United States
| 
|-
| Win
| align=center| 12–4
| Ken Stone
| KO (punches)
| The Ultimate Fighter: Team Lesnar vs. Team dos Santos Finale
| 
| align=center| 1
| align=center| 4:01
| Las Vegas, Nevada, United States
| 
|-
| Loss
| align=center| 11–4
| Dominick Cruz
| Decision (unanimous)
| WEC 53
| 
| align=center| 5
| align=center| 5:00
| Glendale, Arizona, United States
| 
|-
| Win
| align=center| 11–3
| Brad Pickett
| Decision (unanimous)
| WEC 50
| 
| align=center| 3
| align=center| 5:00
| Las Vegas, Nevada, United States
| 
|-
| Win
| align=center| 10-3
| Antonio Banuelos
| Decision (unanimous)
| WEC 48
| 
| align=center| 3
| align=center| 5:00
| Sacramento, California, United States
| 
|-
| Win
| align=center| 9–3
| Chad George
| Submission (front choke)
| WEC 47
| 
| align=center| 1
| align=center| 0:31
| Columbus, Ohio, United States
| 
|-
| Win
| align=center| 8–3
| Takeya Mizugaki
| Decision (unanimous)
| WEC 45
| 
| align=center| 3
| align=center| 5:00
| Las Vegas, Nevada, United States
| 
|-
| Win
| align=center| 7–3
| Noah Thomas
| TKO (punches and elbows)
| WEC 43
| 
| align=center| 1
| align=center| 3:13
| San Antonio, Texas, United States
| 
|-
| Loss
| align=center| 6–3
| Antonio Banuelos
| Decision (split)
| WEC 41
| 
| align=center| 3
| align=center| 5:00
| Sacramento, California, United States
| 
|-
| Win
| align=center| 6–2
| Frank Gomez
| Submission (guillotine choke)
| WEC 38
| 
| align=center| 1
| align=center| 1:09
| San Diego, California, United States
| 
|-
| Win
| align=center| 5–2
| Kenji Osawa
| Decision (unanimous)
| WEC 35
| 
| align=center| 3
| align=center| 5:00
| Las Vegas, Nevada, United States
| 
|-
| Loss
| align=center| 4–2
| Damacio Page
| Decision (unanimous)
| WEC 32
| 
| align=center| 3
| align=center| 5:00
| Rio Rancho, New Mexico, United States
| 
|-
| Win
| align=center| 4–1
| Chris David
| Decision (unanimous)
| ShoXC: Elite Challenger Series
| 
| align=center| 3
| align=center| 5:00
| Santa Ynez, California, United States
| 
|-
| Win
| align=center| 3–1
| Tyler Toner
| Decision (unanimous)
| ROF 29: Aftershock
| 
| align=center| 3
| align=center| 5:00
| Boulder, Colorado, United States
| 
|-
| Loss
| align=center| 2–1
| Joe Jesser
| Submission (armbar)
| ROF 26: Relentless
| 
| align=center| 1
| align=center| 1:08
| Colorado Springs, Colorado, United States
| 
|-
| Win
| align=center| 2–0
| Louie Lagunsad
| Submission (heel hook)
| ROF 25: Overdrive
| 
| align=center| 1
| align=center| 1:43
| Boulder, Colorado, United States
| 
|-
| Win
| align=center| 1–0
| Mike Morris
| Submission (armbar)
| Alaska Fighting Championship 24
| 
| align=center| 1
| align=center| 1:31
| Juneau, Alaska, United States
|

See also
 List of current UFC fighters
 List of male mixed martial artists

References

External links

1982 births
Living people
American male mixed martial artists
American sportspeople of Japanese descent
Mixed martial artists from Idaho
Bantamweight mixed martial artists
Mixed martial artists utilizing collegiate wrestling
Mixed martial artists utilizing Brazilian jiu-jitsu
American practitioners of Brazilian jiu-jitsu
Sportspeople from Boise, Idaho
People from Payson, Utah
People with vitiligo
Ultimate Fighting Championship male fighters